Maddur may refer to :

 Maddur, Mahbubnagar, Telangana, India   
 Maddur, Mandya, Karnataka, India
 Maddur railway bridge collapse, 1897
 Maddur, Ranga Reddy, Telangana, India

See also
 Madder (disambiguation)